Princess Puangsoi Sa-ang (30 September 1866 – 23 April 1950) was a member of Siamese royal family. She was a daughter of King Mongkut and Concubine Tieng Rojadis and half-sister of Chulalongkorn.

Her mother was Chao Chom Manda Tieng Rojanadis (daughter of Phraya Abbhantrikamat and Klai Rojanadis). She was given full name as Phra Chao Borom Wong Ther Phra Ong Chao Phuangsoi Sa-ang.

Honors
  Knight Grand Commander (Second Class, higher grade) of the Most Illustrious Order of Chula Chom Klao
  King Mongkut's Royal Cypher Medal
  King Chulalongkorn's Royal Cypher Medal
   King Rama VI Royal Cypher Medal (First Class)
  King Rama VII Royal Cypher Medal (First Class)
  King Mongkut's Royal Cypher Medal

References 

19th-century Thai women
19th-century Chakri dynasty
20th-century Thai women
20th-century Chakri dynasty
Thai female Phra Ong Chao
Children of Mongkut
1866 births
1950 deaths
Thai people of Laotian descent
Daughters of kings